Blundale is an unincorporated community in Emanuel County, in the U.S. state of Georgia.

History
A post office called Blundale was established in 1901, and remained in operation until 1951. The community had a depot on the Stillmore Air Line Railroad.

References

Unincorporated communities in Emanuel County, Georgia